Shalom Television is an Indian Catholic Christian television channel based in Kerala. The channel broadcasts programs include a daily Holy Mass and also Tridentine Mass format, the traditional Nasrani rosary recitation. It also broadcasts other programs, including interviews, musical shows, competition, quiz shows, chat shows, short films and family-based programs.

History
Shalom was first introduced in 1989 as a small prayer group. It was founded by Saint Thomas Christians and was subsequently expanded in 1998 as a programming block on Asianet channel. It was officially launched as an independent channel in March 2005. The channel, further expanded in publishing media including Shalom Times, Shalom Tidings and Sunday Shalom. The channel has expanded its operation worldwide, including Australia, United Kingdom and North America.

See also
Catholic television
Catholic television channels
Catholic television networks
Padre Pio TV

References

External links

Malayalam-language television channels
Catholic television channels
Television stations in Thiruvananthapuram
Religious television channels in India
Television channels and stations established in 2005
Christian media in Kerala
2005 establishments in Kerala